Deolin Quade Mekoa (born 10 August 1993) is a South African footballer who plays as a winger.

He represented South Africa in the football competition at the 2016 Summer Olympics.

References

1993 births
Living people
South African soccer players
Footballers at the 2016 Summer Olympics
Olympic soccer players of South Africa
South Africa international soccer players
Maritzburg United F.C. players
Cape Town Spurs F.C. players
Bizana Pondo Chiefs F.C. players
South African Premier Division players
National First Division players
Association football wingers